Line terminator may refer to either:

 Newline, a special character or sequence of characters signifying the end of a line of text
 Electrical termination, at the end of a wire or cable to prevent an RF signal from being reflected